Sitar-e Ali (also Romanized as Sītār-e ‘Alī; also known as Sītār-e Morād and Sītār-e Mowlādād) is a village in Sand-e Mir Suiyan Rural District, Dashtiari District, Chabahar County, Sistan and Baluchestan Province, Iran. At the 2006 census, its population was 135, in 32 families.

References 

Populated places in Chabahar County